The Colorado Cougars are a team of the American Basketball Association which began play in the 2010–11 season. Based in Loveland, Colorado, the Cougars play their home games at Loveland High School.

Team owner Patrick Kelley was sent a cease and desist order by Colorado Securities Commissioner Fred Joseph over attempts to raise money for this team. Joseph alleges the way he was attempting to finance the team was a violation of the Colorado Securities Act. Kelley agreed with the order but did not admit or deny violating the law in the agreement.

References

External links
Colorado Cougars website

Defunct American Basketball Association (2000–present) teams
Basketball teams in Colorado
Loveland, Colorado
Basketball teams established in 2011